Khettouti Sed El Djir (formerly Zerarka) is a town and commune in M'Sila Province, Algeria.

References

Communes of M'Sila Province
M'Sila Province